Sparganothoides laderana is a species of moth of the family Tortricidae. It is found in Mexico, where it has been recorded from Popocatépetl and Iguala in Guerrero.

The length of the forewings is 11.2–11.9 mm. The ground colour of the forewings is brownish grey, with brown, orange and white scales. The hindwings are greyish white.

Etymology
The species name is derived from Spanish ladera (meaning slope).

References

Moths described in 2009
Sparganothoides